Cumberland Council is the local authority for Cumberland in England. It is a unitary authority, having the powers of a non-metropolitan county and district council combined. It will operate as a shadow authority until taking up its powers in 2023. Cumberland Council will replace Cumbria County Council, Allerdale Borough Council, Carlisle City Council and Copeland Borough Council.

History
The council was created as part of the 2019–2023 structural changes to local government in England.

Branding
The council logo was approved at a meeting of the shadow executive on 20 July 2022. The logo draws on symbols found on the flag and coat of arms the traditional county of Cumberland. It features a Parnassus flower, the traditional county flower, wavy lines which represent the fells, mountains, lakes and coast of the council area and the colours blue and green, which are the livery colours of the traditional county.

Politics

The first election to Cumberland Council was held on 5 May 2022. All 46 seats were up for election. Labour won 30 seats, giving it a majority. Conservatives have 7 seats, Liberal Democrats 4 seats, Independents 3 seats and Green Party 2 seats. Turnout was 36.1%. In March 2023, one Labour councillor defected to the Liberal Democrats.

Composition

References

External links
Cumberland Council
Cumberland Council on Twitter

Local education authorities in England
Local authorities in Cumbria
Unitary authority councils of England